Events in the year 1887 in Japan.

Incumbents
Monarch: Emperor Meiji
Prime Minister: Itō Hirobumi

Governors
Aichi Prefecture: Minoru Katsumata
Akita Prefecture: Sada Aoyama
Aomori Prefecture: Nabeshima Miki
Ehime Prefecture: Shinpei Seki
Fukui Prefecture: Tsutomu Ishiguro
Fukuoka Prefecture: Yasujo
Fukushima Prefecture: Hiraochi Orita
Gifu Prefecture: Toshi Kozaki
Gunma Prefecture: Sato Atasesan
Hiroshima Prefecture: Senda Sadaaki
Ibaraki Prefecture: Sadanori Yasuda
Iwate Prefecture: Shoichiro Ishii
Kanagawa Prefecture: Baron Tadatsu Hayashi
Kochi Prefecture: Yoshiaki Tonabe
Kumamoto Prefecture: Yoshiaki Tonabe
Kyoto Prefecture: Baron Utsumi Tadakatsu
Mie Prefecture: Ishii Kuni
Miyagi Prefecture: Matsudaira Masanao
Miyazaki Prefecture: Teru Tananbe then Tokito Konkyo then Takayoshi Kyoganu
Nagano Prefecture: Baron Seiichiro Kinashi
Niigata Prefecture: Shinozaki Goro
Oita Prefecture: Ryokichi Nishimura
Okinawa Prefecture: Sadakiyo Osako then Minoru Fukuhara
Osaka Prefecture: Tateno Tsuyoshi
Saga Prefecture: Kamata
Saitama Prefecture: Kiyohide Yoshida
Shimane Prefecture: Sukeo Kabayama
Tochigi Prefecture: Orita Hirauchi
Tokyo: Marquis Shigeru Hachisuke
Toyama Prefecture: Fujishima Masaki
Yamagata Prefecture: Shibahara Sum

Events
January 22 - Tōkyō Denkō begins selling electric lights.

Births
February 4 – Masaichi Niimi, admiral (d. 1993)
February 9 – Tsuchida Bakusen, nihonga painter (d. 1936) 
March 25 – Chūichi Nagumo, admiral (d. 1944)
July 28 – Tetsu Katayama, politician and 33rd Prime Minister of Japan (d. 1978)
November 15 – Hitoshi Ashida, politician and 34th Prime Minister of Japan (d. 1959)

Deaths
December 6 – Shimazu Hisamitsu, samurai (b. 1817)

References

 
1880s in Japan
Japan
Years of the 19th century in Japan